Ernest Cole (20 March 1875 – 24 September 1965) was a New Zealand cricketer. He played one first-class match for Taranaki in 1896/97.

See also
 List of Taranaki representative cricketers

References

External links
 

1875 births
1965 deaths
New Zealand cricketers
Taranaki cricketers
Cricketers from Nelson, New Zealand